This is a list of earthquakes in 2013. Only earthquakes of magnitude 6 or above are included, unless they result in damage and/or casualties, or are notable for some other reason.  All dates are listed according to UTC time. This year was quite busy with 17 events above magnitude 7 and two above magnitude 8, in Kamchatka and Santa Cruz Islands. Deadly quakes struck Pakistan, Philippines, China and Iran.

Compared to other years

By death toll

 Note: At least 10 dead

By magnitude

 Note: At least 7.0 magnitude

By month

January

No damage was reported in Kazakhstan, but at least 156 houses were destroyed and 636 others were damaged in Kyrgyzstan, while in Xinjiang, China, 216 houses collapsed and 7,458 buildings were damaged.
One person died of a heart attack, windows broke, rockfalls occurred and some walls were damaged or collapsed in Vallenar and in Copiapo. 

February

Note: A number of large aftershocks were recorded following the 2013 Solomon Islands earthquake, Which had a magnitude of 8.0 on February 6. In order to eliminate cluttering, only aftershocks above  6.5 will be included.
 A magnitude 6.0 earthquake struck the Santa Cruz Islands on February 1, at a depth of 9.3 km.
 A magnitude 6.3 earthquake struck the Santa Cruz Islands on February 1, at a depth of 19.9 km.
 A magnitude 6.4 earthquake struck the Santa Cruz Islands on February 1, at a depth of 22 km.
 A magnitude 6.9 earthquake struck Hokkaido, Japan on February 2, at a depth of 107 km. Thirteen people were slightly injured, and some damage was caused in Kushiro and Obihiro.
 A magnitude 6.1 earthquake struck Santa Cruz Islands on February 2, at a depth of 10 km.
 A magnitude 6.3 earthquake struck Santa Cruz Islands on February 6, at a depth of 10 km.
 A magnitude 8.0 earthquake struck Santa Cruz Islands on February 6, at a depth of 28.7 km. The earthquake generated an 11 m (36 ft) tsunami, which destroyed several coastal villages, killing at least 13.
 A magnitude 7.1 earthquake struck Santa Cruz Islands on February 6, at a depth of 10.1 km.
 A magnitude 7.0 earthquake struck Santa Cruz Islands on February 6, at a depth of 10.1 km.
 A magnitude 6.6 earthquake struck Santa Cruz Islands on February 7, at a depth of 10 km.
 A magnitude 6.8 earthquake struck Santa Cruz Islands on February 8, at a depth of 18 km.
 A magnitude 7.1 earthquake struck Santa Cruz Islands on February 8, at a depth of 21 km.
 A magnitude 6.9 earthquake struck Colombia on February 9 at a depth of 153.8 km. Fifteen people were injured and 82 houses collapsed, with 1,896 others damaged.
 A magnitude 6.6 earthquake struck Santa Cruz Islands on February 9, at a depth of 15.7 km.
 A magnitude 6.6 earthquake struck Far Eastern Federal District on February 14, at a depth of 9.9 km.
 A magnitude 6.2 earthquake struck south of Mindanao in the Philippines, at a depth of 98.2 km.
One person died of a heart-attack and many buildings were damaged.
 A magnitude 6.1 earthquake struck Argentina, at a depth of 585.8 km on February 22.

 A magnitude 5.3 earthquake struck Peru, at a depth of 7.9 km on February 22. At least 31 people were injured, 28 homes collapsed or were left uninhabitable and over 80 others were damaged.

March

 A magnitude 6.1 earthquake struck the South Sandwich Islands on March 19 at a depth of 

April

Three people were killed by landslides in Tolikara Regency. 
A total of 12 houses were destroyed and 66 others, along with two schools, were damaged. 43 people were evacuated.
Cracked walls, collapsed roof tiles and items falling off shelves in stores were reported.
According to Pakistani authorities, 39 people lost their lives in the Panjgur and Mashkeel areas of Balochistan Province, which borders Iran. One fatality was reported from Iran, while a total of 117 were injured across the two countries.
Two people were injured and 311 buildings were damaged.
Over 193 people were killed, 24 are missing, and at least 12,211 were injured, more than 968 of them seriously.
One building collapsed and several others, including a school were damaged in Guacamayas. Power outages also occurred in Mexico City.
 A magnitude 5.6 earthquake struck Afghanistan on April 24 at a depth of 40 miles with an epicentre  from Mehtar Lam, the capital of the province, 18 people were killed in the tremors and more than 100 were injured.

May

Two people were killed by landslides.
One child was killed by the quake. 
At least seventeen buildings were damaged in Samara, one of them severely.

June

One person died of a heart-attack and six buildings, including a church were destroyed damaged.

July

Three people were injured and 111 houses were destroyed, with 580 others damaged.
The earthquake was preceded by a series of foreshocks, including a 5.7 and 5.8.
At least 95 people were killed and more than 1,000 others injured, with more than 9,000 houses collapsing.

August

The USGS, however, listed this quake as 6.5.
 A magnitude 5.8 earthquake struck Yunnan, China, on August 31 at a depth of 9.8 km, killing 5 people.

September

This was an aftershock of the 6.5 earthquake.
This was an aftershock of the magnitude 6.5 earthquake on September 4.
The earthquake killed 825 people and wounded hundreds more.
The earthquake killed at least 3 people.

October

The earthquake killed at least 222 people and injured 976.
The earthquake killed an old man, two others people were injured, 159 houses and two religious buildings were damaged.

November

At least 60,000 houses were damaged and 67,000 were evacuated. 
The earthquake killed at least 7 people and another 30 were injured.

December

References

2013
 
2013